Daniel Robert John Campbell (January 22, 1926 – April 5, 1992) was a Canadian politician. He served in the Legislative Assembly of British Columbia from 1956 to 1972, as a Social Credit member for the constituency of Comox. He served in the provincial cabinet as Minister of Municipal Affairs. He died in 1992.

References

1926 births
1992 deaths
British Columbia Social Credit Party MLAs
Members of the Executive Council of British Columbia
Scottish emigrants to Canada
20th-century Canadian legislators